Once upon a time, Hyderabad was known as City of Lakes. Some of these lakes are natural and various are manmade bodies. As per various sources only a few decades back, Hyderabad had a large number of water bodies such as lakes, reservoirs, rivers, streams, aquaculture ponds, tanks etc. (as per some sources between 3000 and 7000 including natural and manmade bodies. Locally known as cheruvu, kunta, tanks ). Most of these lakes have totally disappeared and the surface area of most of the surviving lakes have shrunken and turned to tiny ponds and cesspool. Some of the lakes which have totally disappeared are Tigal Kunta, Somajiguda Tank, Mir Jumla tank, Pahar Tigal Kunta, Kunta Bhawani Das, Nawab Saheb Kunta, Afzalsagar, Nallakunta, Masab Tank etc. Hussainsagar Lake, Kunta Mallaiyapalli have shrunk drastically. Out of thousands of water bodies those were existing in 1970s in various sizes in and around Hyderabad, today  only about 70 to 500 of them have survived. Most of them have disappeared due to encroachment or have been illegally drained for real estate projects by private or government agencies.  The existing lakes have been used to dump garbage and sewage water. Most of these lakes and tanks were built during the regime of Qutub Shah in 16th and 17th century and later by Nizams as a source of drinking water for the residents of Hyderabad. The area of Hussain Sagar, which is the largest lake in Hyderabad shrunk by more than 40% i.e. from 550 ha to 349 ha in just 30 years. This lake was built in 1575 AD and since 1930 is not being used as a source for drinking water. 

 Similarly, the area occupied by Shamirpet lake shrunk from 486 ha in 1989 to 256 ha in 2006. In total about 3245 ha of water bodies were lost in 12 years (from 1989 to 2001).

As of 2010, 500 lakes were under HUDA jurisdiction. As of May 2018, HUDA maintains record of 169 lakes which occupy an area of more than 10 hectares. Out of this 62 lakes were under the control of government, 25 are owned by private organisations and 82 lakes are under joint government private ownership. As per existing government norms, no construction of any kind, irrespective of the ownership status is allowed on the lake bed. This rules are frequently violated both by government and private agencies.

Some surviving lakes  are listed below. Some of them are under restoration with funds provided by the National Lake Conservation Plan. 
 Out of the 169 large water bodies notified by HUDA, in first phase it was proposed to restore 87 lakes.

 Hussain Sagar
 Osman Sagar
 Himayat Sagar
 Shamirpet Lake
 Mir Alam Tank
 Safilguda Lake
 Ramakrishnapuram Lake
 Kapra Lake
 Durgam Cheruvu
 Alwal Lake
 Saroornagar Lake
 Bon Cheruvu
 Jeedimetla Cheruvu
 Rangadhamuni Cheruvu (IDL Lake), Kukatpally
 Nacharam Cheruvu
 Nallagandla Lake
 Khajaguda Talab 
 Malkam Cheruvu
 Langarhouz Cheruvu
 Ramanthapur Cheruvu
 Aryana Cheruvu
 Manikonda Cheruvu (Yellama Cheruvu), near Lanco Hills
 Mushkin Cheruvu
 Mundikunta Lake
 Fox Sagar Lake
 Ameenpur Lake
 Khajaguda Lake  (Pedda Cheruvu)
 Nekhampur Lake

See also
 Stepwells in Hyderabad
 Lakes in Bangalore

References

H
L